2010 Sanfrecce Hiroshima season

Competitions

Player statistics

Other pages
 J. League official site

Sanfrecce Hiroshima
Sanfrecce Hiroshima seasons